Valiabad Rural District is in the Central District of Qarchak County, Tehran province, Iran. At the National Census of 2006, its population (as a part of the former Qarchak District of Varamin County) was 27,430 in 6,380 households. There were 27,948 inhabitants in 7,292 households at the following census of 2011. At the most recent census of 2016, the population of the rural district was 26,437 in 7,581 households, by which time the district had been separated from the county and Qarchak County established. The largest of its nine villages was Davudabad, with 6,399 people.

References 

Qarchak County

Rural Districts of Tehran Province

Populated places in Tehran Province

Populated places in Qarchak County